Allen Buansi is an American politician. He serves as a Democratic member for the 56th district of the North Carolina House of Representatives.

Buansi attended Dartmouth College, where he earned his bachelor's degree in 2009. He then attended the University of North Carolina School of Law, where he earned his Juris Doctor degree in 2015. Buansi served on the Chapel Hill town council from 2017 to 2021.

In May 2022, Buansi narrowly won the Democratic primary for the 56th district of the North Carolina House of Representatives in a race to succeed retiring Rep. Verla Insko. With Buansi facing no general election challengers, Insko resigned from the legislature before the expiration of her term, allowing Buansi to be appointed to her seat and begin his service in the legislature on June 1, 2022.

Electoral history

2022

References

Living people
Place of birth missing (living people)
Year of birth missing (living people)
Democratic Party members of the North Carolina House of Representatives
21st-century American politicians
21st-century African-American politicians
Dartmouth College alumni
University of North Carolina School of Law alumni
20th-century African-American people